Shorwell (pronounced Shorrel by some locals and Islanders) is a village and civil parish on the Isle of Wight, United Kingdom. Shorwell was one of Queen Victoria's favourite places to visit on the Isle of Wight.

History
The parish of Shorwell contains three manors: North Shorwell (or Northcourt), South Shorwell (or Westcourt), and Wolverton. The Shorwell helmet, a sixth-century Anglo-Saxon helmet, was found in the parish. Northcourt was built in 1615 by the Deputy Governor of the Island, Sir John Leigh, and is the islands's largest manor house.

Features

Northcourt Manor's grounds contain a spring, the Shor Well, which feeds a stream, one of the tributaries of the Buddle Brook. 
There is a pub called the Crown Inn, featuring a pond stocked with brown trout.

Shorwell's terrain is hilly, and backs onto the chalk downs leading to Chale Bay and Compton Bay; several public footpaths crisscross this region, linking the village up to walking routes nearer the sea. The twelfth-century St. Peter's Church is in the village.

The island's oldest netball club is based in Shorwell as well as Shorwell United, the Island's oldest Sunday League football club.

It is linked to other parts of the Island by Southern Vectis bus route 12, serving Freshwater, Totland and Newport as well as intermediate villages.

References

External links
Photographs of Shorwell, Francis Frith Collection.

Villages on the Isle of Wight
Civil parishes in the Isle of Wight